An  is a type of informal Japanese bar that serves alcoholic drinks and snacks.  are casual places for after-work drinking, similar to a pub, a Spanish tapas bar, or an American saloon or tavern.

Etymology 
The word  entered the English language by 1987.

History 

Anecdotes and songs that appear in the  show that -style establishments existed in Japan at the early 700s. There is a record dating to 733 when rice was collected as a brewing fee tax under the jurisdiction of the government office called .

The full-scale development of  began around the Edo period (1603-1867). At liquor stores that used to sell alcohol by weight, people began to drink alcohol while standing. Gradually, some  began using sake barrels as stools for their customers, and gradually began to offer simple snacks called .

An  in Tokyo made international news in 1962, when Robert F. Kennedy ate there during a meeting with Japanese labor leaders.

 and other small pubs or establishments are exempted from a smoking ban that was passed by the National Diet in July 2018 and fully enforced since April 2020.

Dining style 

 are often likened to taverns or pubs, but there are a number of differences.

Many  offer a choice of both as well as seating by the bar. Some  restaurants are also  style, literally translated as "drinking while standing".

It is local custom and usually charged onto the bill in lieu of an entry fee.

The menu may be on the table, displayed on walls, or both. Picture menus are common in larger . Food and drink are ordered throughout the course of the session as desired. They are brought to the table, and the bill is added up at the end of the session. Unlike other Japanese styles of eating, food items are usually shared by everyone at the table, similar to Spanish tapas.

For a set price per person, customers can continue ordering as much food and/or drink as they wish, usually with a time limit of two or three hours.

 dining can be intimidating to non-Japanese because of the wide variety of menu items and the slow pace. Food is normally ordered slowly over several courses rather than all at once. The kitchen will serve the food when it is ready, rather than in the formal courses of Western restaurants. Typically, a beer is ordered when one is sitting down before perusing the menu.

Typical menu items 

 offer a wide variety of dishes. Items typically available are:

Alcoholic drinks 
Sake, a Japanese alcoholic beverage made by fermenting polished rice
Beer

Cocktails
Sour mix

Wine
Whisky

Some establishments offer a bottle keep service, where a patron can purchase an entire bottle of liquor (usually  or whisky) and store the unfinished portion for a future visit.

Food 

 food is usually more substantial than tapas or mezze. Many items are designed to be shared. Example menu items may include:
Edamameboiled and salted soybean pods
various vegetables served with a sesame dressing
bite-sized fried chicken
grilled meat or vegetable skewers
Salads
Sashimislices of raw fish
chicken wings
Tofu
deep fried tofu in broth
chilled silken tofu with toppings
pickles
grilled noodles
grilled chicken skewers

For the most part, Japanese  customers do not eat rice or noodles ("staple food") at the same time as they drink alcohol, since sake, brewed from rice, traditionally takes the place of rice in a meal.

Types 
 were traditionally down-to-earth places where men drank sake and beer after work. However, modern  customers are more likely to include independent women and students. Many  today cater to a more diverse clientele by offering cocktails and wines as well as a sophisticated interior. Chain  are often large and offer an extensive selection of food and drink, allowing them to host big, sometimes rowdy, parties. Watami, Shoya, Shirokiya, Tsubohachi, and Murasaki are some well known chains in Japan.

are often called  ("red lantern"), after the red paper lanterns traditionally displayed outside. Today, the term usually refers to small, non-chain . Some unrelated businesses that are not  also sometimes display red lanterns.

Cosplay 
Cosplay  became popular in the 2000s. The staff wear costumes and wait on customers. In some establishments, shows are performed. Costumes include those for butlers and maids.

They usually take the form of street stalls with seating and are popular in winter.

are places in which customers sit around an open hearth on which chefs grill seafood and vegetables. Fresh ingredients are displayed for customers to point at whenever they want to order.

The chicken skewers are often grilled in front of customers.

In literature, TV drama and film 
 appear in Japanese novels with adaptations to TV drama and film. A TV drama was produced in 1992 on Friday Drama Theater, Fuji Television. Another film, starring Kenichi Hagiwara, is a comical ghost story; a typical  in Yokohama is run by the owner, his new wife and the ghost of his former wife.

This was not often seen in countryside, aside from station towns along  highways in the 17th to mid-19th century.

The 2006 manga series  depicts the manager of a 12-seat  in Shinjuku, Tokyo, that only opens from 12pm to 7am. The manga was later turned into a TV show, which was widely distributed throughout Asia and the internationally on Netflix, followed by two films. There were also several remakes made in countries such as China and Korea.

The 2012 manga series  (Alternate World Bar "Nobu") depicted a new  whose front door opened to a parallel world, vaguely reminiscent of 15th century Germany. The  featured a wide range of food and drinks from Japan. An anime adaptation premiered in 2018 and a live-action adaptation premiered in 2020.

See also 
Cuisine of Japan
List of public house topics
Ramen shop

References

Bibliography

Further reading 
Izakaya: The Japanese Pub Cookbook (2008) by Mark Robinson, photographs by Masashi Kuma, Kodansha International
Izakaya: Japanese Bar Food (Hardie Grant Publishing 2012), photographs by Chris Chen. .
Izakaya by Hideo Dekura (New Holland Publishers 2015). .

External links 

Japanese restaurants
Pubs
Restaurants by type
Types of drinking establishment
Japanese words and phrases